Mats Östman (born 4 October 1946) is a Swedish ski jumper. He competed in the normal hill and large hill events at the 1968 Winter Olympics.

References

External links
 

1946 births
Living people
Swedish male ski jumpers
Olympic ski jumpers of Sweden
Ski jumpers at the 1968 Winter Olympics
People from Örnsköldsvik Municipality
Sportspeople from Västernorrland County